Pedassaare may refer to several places in Estonia:

Pedassaare, Jõgeva County, village in Estonia
Pedassaare, Lääne-Viru County, village in Estonia